White County may refer to:

 White County, New South Wales, Australia
 White County, Arkansas, United States
 White County, Georgia, United States
 White County, Illinois, United States
 White County, Indiana, United States
 White County, Tennessee, United States

County name disambiguation pages

ru:Округ Уайт